FBC TV is an entertainment and news channel based in Fiji broadcasting in English, Hindi and Fijian. It is the third commercial free to air channel in Fiji. It was launched on 25 November 2011 by the Fiji Prime Minister - Rear Admiral (Ret.) Frank Bainimarama. It covers 90% of Fiji’s population through VHF and UHF TV Band. Fiji Television, Mai TV and PBS TV are the main competitors of FBC TV in the country. FBC TV is operated by Fiji Broadcasting Corporation, the company which also runs 6 radio stations, Radio Fiji One (iTaukei), Radio Fiji Two (Hindustani), Gold FM-Fiji (English), Bula FM (Fijian), 2day FM-Fiji (English) and Mirchi FM (Hindi). It had sold over $100,000 worth of television programming, even before it had officially signed on air.

FBC TV lifted the standard of local television news coverage by bringing in a top New Zealand news producer for months to train their local TV journalists. Its signal now reaches places in Fiji where no TV signal was available previously.

Mai TV was first to break Fiji Television’s monopoly but did not have the years of market domination and exclusivity Fiji TV had been given to build its powerful position. FBC, already a successful radio broadcaster, became a powerhouse when it launched FBC TV, with support from the Government.

FBC TV was given exclusive rights in Fiji to telecast Miss World 2012. In October, 2013, it acquired the rights to exclusively air the 2013–14 Premier League live on its free-to-air channel. as well as the 2013 Constellation Cup.

The government enacted a Television (Cross-Carriage of Designated Events) Decree to strip away exclusive sports content owned by Fiji TV and make those lucrative content available to the financially struggling FBC TV, headed by Riyaz Saiyed-Khaiyum, its chief executive officer. The official reason given was that all Fijians should have access to important world events including sports which included the FIFA World Cup as well as the World Rugby Sevens Series, the Rugby World Cup, Rugby League World Cup, the World Netball Championship, the Olympic Games, the Commonwealth Games, the Pacific Games, the Pacific Mini Games, the Coca-Cola Games, state funerals, general election results, the national budget address and parliamentary proceedings. This allowed FBCTV the rights to broadcast  these major events on free-to-air.

In November 2014, FBCTV was tasked with the job of managing the digital TV project to allow the transition of broadcast signals from analogue to Digital television in Fiji. In July 2015, it commenced tests in the Suva, Nasinu corridor.

In August 2016, when Fiji moved into Digital broadcasting, FBC launched two more channels, FBC 2 and FBC Plus.

FBC 2 would provide viewers with content from other parts of the world which Fijians could not access on free-to-air television.

FBC Plus provided viewers with shows that were aired on FBC TV, three hours after its broadcast on FBC TV. For example, if the Indian soap opera Pavitra Rishta had aired on FBC TV at 12:00 p.m, FBC Plus would air the same show at 3:00 p.m.

After a successful trial of the Digital Television platform in the Suva - Nasinu corridor, the country's first Digital TV platform, Walesi was launched on the 25th of June 2018, by the Attorney General, Aiyaz Sayed-Khaiyum in his portfolio as Minister for Communications.

Programming

Hindi

iTaukei

English

Korean

Kids Program

Teen Sitcoms

Previous Shows

References

Television stations in Fiji
Television channels and stations established in 2011